Thomas Murray House is a historic home located in Clearfield, Pennsylvania, United States.  It is a two-and-a-half-story brick dwelling in the Italianate style and constructed in 1876. It was constructed for Thomas Murray, a prominent attorney in late 19th-century Clearfield. The house was converted to apartments in 1943.

It was listed on the National Register of Historic Places in 1979.

References

See also 
 National Register of Historic Places listings in Clearfield County, Pennsylvania

Houses on the National Register of Historic Places in Pennsylvania
Italianate architecture in Pennsylvania
Houses completed in 1876
Houses in Clearfield County, Pennsylvania
National Register of Historic Places in Clearfield County, Pennsylvania